Oinoi is a village in Boeotia, Greece. Since the 2011 local government reform it is part of the municipality Tanagra, and the municipal unit of Schimatari. Population 442 (2011). It is situated in the wide valley of the river Asopos, at 6 km from the South Euboean Gulf coast. It is situated about 3 km southeast of Schimatari, 26 km east of Thebes and 41 km north-northwest of Athens.

Transport

Road
The Motorway 1 (Athens - Lamia - Thessaloniki) passes northeast of Oinoi.

Rail
The Village is served by Oinoi railway station, just west of the town on the Piraeus–Platy line and Athens-Chalcis line (the Oinoi–Chalcis line), with frequent service in both directions.

Air
The Hellenic Air Force's Tanagra Airport lies to the northwest.

Population

External links
 Oinoi on the GTP Travel Pages

References

Populated places in Boeotia